Garland Anderson may refer to:

 Garland Anderson (composer) (1933–2001), American composer and pianist
 Garland Anderson (playwright) (1886–1938), African American playwright